Marie-Denise Vriot (1742 – 1817), stage name Madame Suin, was a French stage actress.   

She was engaged at the Comédie-Française in 1775. She became a Sociétaires of the Comédie-Française in 1776. 

She mainly performed mother roles. She was also known as a cultivated and intellectual participator of the salon-culture in contemporary Paris. She was also deeply involved in the administration and economy of the Comédie-Française, and performed many assignments within the bookkeeping, economy and business affairs of the theatre.

References

External links 
  "Suin Marie-Denise Vriot, dite Mme", Base La Grange, Comédie-Française

1742 births
1817 deaths
18th-century French actresses
French stage actresses